For the soil type, see oxisol.

Torrox is a municipality in the province of Málaga in the autonomous community of Andalusia, southern Spain. It belongs to the comarca of Axarquía. It is located in the Costa del Sol (specifically the Costa del Sol Oriental), on the shores of the Mediterranean Sea and the foothills of the Sierra de Almijara.

It is frequented especially by German and British tourists.  The city itself is divided into sections: Torrox Costa on the sea and Torrox Pueblo, 4 km inland. Torrox Park, a housing section in between the costa and the village, could be seen as another division. Torrox is located in close proximity to Nerja.

Notable people

 Almanzor, Former Chancellor of the Umayyad Caliphate of Córdoba

 Raúl Baena, footballer

Twin towns
 Kirkel, Germany
 Mauléon, France

References

Municipalities in the Province of Málaga
Seaside resorts in Spain